Inés Faddi Id Guedouz (born 3 April 2001) is a Spanish-born Moroccan footballer who plays as a midfielder for Primera Federación club Granada CF and the Morocco women's national team.

Club career 
Faddi has played for El Olivar, Zaragoza CFF B, Oliver and AEM in Spain.

International career
Faddi made her senior debut for Morocco on 14 June 2021 as an 80th-minute substitution in a 3–2 friendly home win over Mali.

See also
List of Morocco women's international footballers

References

External links 
Inés Faddi at BDFútbol

2001 births
Living people
Citizens of Morocco through descent
Moroccan women's footballers
Women's association football midfielders
Morocco women's international footballers
Footballers from Zaragoza
Spanish women's footballers
Zaragoza CFF players
SE AEM players
Granada CF (women) players
Segunda Federación (women) players
Spanish sportspeople of Moroccan descent